
Gmina Szreńsk is a rural gmina (administrative district) in Mława County, Masovian Voivodeship, in east-central Poland.

Villages
Gmina Szreńsk contains the villages and settlements of Bielawy, Doziny, Grądek, Kobuszyn, Krzywki-Bośki, Krzywki-Piaski, Kunki, Liberadz, Ługi, Miączyn Duży, Miączyn Mały, Miłotki, Mostowo, Nowe Garkowo, Ostrów, Pączkowo, Proszkowo, Przychód, Rochnia, Sławkowo, Stare Garkowo, Szreńsk, Wola Proszkowska and Złotowo.

Neighbouring gminas
Gmina Szreńsk is bordered by the gminas of Bieżuń, Kuczbork-Osada, Lipowiec Kościelny, Radzanów, Strzegowo, Wiśniewo and Żuromin.

References

Polish official population figures 2006

Szrensk
Mława County